is a third-generation Japanese-Brazilian computer scientist, professor of computer science and learning technology at the University of Sao Paulo (USP) since 2019, where he also serves as director of the Applied Computing in Education Laboratory. From July 2022, Isotani joined the Harvard Graduate School of Education as a Visiting Professor. In the same year, Isotani was elected to the Executive Committee of the International Artificial Intelligence in Education Society (IAIED), making him the first-ever member from Latin America to occupy such position.

Isotani studied Computer Science at the University of Sao Paulo (USP), where he received a B.Sc. (Dec. 2002) and an M.Sc. (Apr. 2005). In 2009, he earned his doctorate in Information Engineering from Osaka University, Japan (Sep. 2009). His Ph.D. thesis was entitled "An Ontological Engineering Approach to Computer-Supported Collaborative Learning". His doctoral supervisor at Osaka University was Riichiro Mizoguchi.

Before joining the University of Sao Paulo as a professor, Isotani was employed at the Human-Computer Interaction Institute at Carnegie Mellon University, USA (Oct 2009 - Mar 2011) as a postdoctoral researcher.

References

External links 
Isotani’s faculty page at University of Sao Paulo
Isotani’s faculty page at Harvard University
Isotani’s ORCID page